Montionkuy is a village in the Solenzo Department of Banwa Province in western Burkina Faso. As of 2005, it had a population of 786.

References

Populated places in the Boucle du Mouhoun Region
Banwa Province